State Route 133 (SR 133) is a state route in northeastern Tennessee in Johnson County.

Route description

SR 133 begins in Shady Valley, at an intersection with US 421, SR 34, and SR 91.  The highway heads north through farmland to pass through Crandull, where it begins to follow the former alignment of the Beaver Dam Railroad. SR 133 then enters the mountains of the Cherokee National Forest, where it becomes curvy and narrow. It passes through the Backbone Rock Tunnel, an old railroad tunnel used by the Beaver Dam Railroad known as "the shortest tunnel in the world", via a bridge over Beaverdam Creek on either end. SR 133 then exits the mountains and the Cherokee National Forest to level and straighten out to pass through Sutherland before reaching its northern terminus at the state border with Virginia.

Major intersections

References

133
Transportation in Johnson County, Tennessee